Ramjas School may refer to:

Ramjas School, Anand Parbat, New Delhi, India
Ramjas Public School (Day Boarding), Anand Parbat, New Delhi, India
Ramjas School, Pusa Road, New Delhi, India
Ramjas School, R. K. Puram, New Delhi, India